The Paradise Club is a BBC television crime drama series, broadcast between 19 September 1989 and 27 November 1990. The series starred Don Henderson and Leslie Grantham as Frank and Danny Kane, siblings who inherit a nightclub from their mother, Ma Kane, a matriarch of a criminal South London gang, after she tragically dies. At the start of the series, Frank is working as a priest but decides to return to London to steer his brother Danny away from crime. The series featured a large supporting cast, with Bruce Dickinson of Iron Maiden notably making an appearance in the episode "Rock and Roll Roulette". A total of 20 episodes were broadcast over the course of 2 series. The first two episodes of series 1 were partly filmed in Broadway Market, London Broadway Market, apparently chosen for its authentic London character. Around the time of original broadcast, there was some criticism for possible negative stereotyping of ethnic minorities in the series. 

The series has never officially been released on DVD, due to issues surrounding clearance rights for the music used. Notably, the series has yet to be repeated on any of the BBC's co-owned free-to-air digital channels, such as UK Gold or UKTV Drama (it has been aired on UK Gold). However, both series are available to purchase from Amazon, but these are VHS to DVD transfers of the original broadcast, in varying quality. A soundtrack album of music featured in the series was also released in 1989, and was available on CD, LP and Cassette.

Cast
 Don Henderson as Frank Kane (Series 1–2)
 Leslie Grantham as Danny Kane (Series 1–2)
 Leon Herbert as Polish Joe (Series 1–2)
 Barbara Wilshere as Carol Kane (Series 1–2)
 Peter Gowen as Jonjo O'Brady (Series 1–2)
 Kevin Williams as Ronnie Blythe (Series 1–2)
 Nick Dawney as Terry Kane (Series 1–2) 
 Annie Scott-Horne as Samantha Kane (Series 1–2)
 Jack Galloway as DS Jack Nesbitt (Series 2)
 Nigel Harrison as DS Fielding (Series 1)
 Thomas Craig as DC Lambton (Series 1)
 Frederick Warder as DCS Graham (Series 1)
 Pete Lee-Wilson as DC Milligan (Series 1)
 Kitty Aldridge as DI Rosy Campbell (Series 1)
 David Swift as Max Wartbug (Series 1–2)
 Caroline Bliss as DI Sarah Turnbull (Series 1)
 Phillip Martin Brown as Peter Noonan (Series 1)
 James Saxon as DI Fairweather (Series 1)

Supporting Cast
 Freddie Earlle as Walter Trafficante (Series 1; three episodes)
 Ian Lindsay as DCS Torrance (Series 1; three episodes)
 Oona Kirsch as WDC Tilly Spink (Series 2; three episodes)
 Robert Perkins as DC Benson (Series 2; three episodes)
 Grant Thoburn as DC Ian Cornwall (Series 2; three episodes)
 David Ryall as Bishop Sykes (Series 1–2; three episodes)
 Philip Bretherton as DI Don Wright (Series 1; two episodes)
 Ben Daniels as DC Webster (Series 1; two episodes)
 Ken Drury as DCS George Gibson (Series 1; two episodes)
 Michael Fenner as DC Dave Hutton (Series 1; two episodes)

Episodes

Series 1 (1989)

Series 2 (1990)

References

External links

1989 British television series debuts
1990 British television series endings
1980s British drama television series
1990s British drama television series
BBC television dramas
English-language television shows
Television shows set in London